Mets Masrik is a village in the Vardenis Municipality of the Gegharkunik Province of Armenia. The village is located close to Pokr Masrik.

History 
The town has been inhabited since the 7th century and has a khachkar dated 881, two shrines from the 12th and 13th centuries, and a 17th-century church.

Demographics 
The village had 3,132 inhabitants in 2011.

Gallery

References

External links 

 
 

Populated places in Gegharkunik Province